The Lent Bumps 2022 were a set of rowing races at Cambridge University from Tuesday 1 March 2022 to Saturday 5 March 2022. The event was run as a bumps race and was the 128th set of races in the series of Lent Bumps which have been held annually in late February or early March since 1887. In this edition of the Lents, the women's divisions raced before the equivalent men's divisions, and the numbers of men's and women's boats competing were equal.

The races were the first set of Bumps to be held following the COVID-19 pandemic, which forced the cancellation of the Lents in 2021 and the Mays in 2020 and 2021. They were also the first in which Lucy Cavendish fielded a men's boat after the college became co-educational in October 2021.

Head of the River crews
  rowed over on all four days to retain the men's headship they won in 2020.

Highest 2nd VIIIs

Links to races in other years

Bumps Charts

Below are the bumps charts for all 4 men's and all 4 women's divisions, with the men's event on the left and women's event on the right. The bumps chart shows the progress of every crew over all four days of the racing. To follow the progress of any particular crew, find the crew's name on the left side of the chart and follow the line to the end-of-the-week finishing position on the right of the chart.

This chart may not be displayed correctly if you are using a large font size on your browser. A simple way to check is to see that the first horizontal bold line, marking the boundary between divisions, lies between positions 17 and 18.

References 

2022 in rowing
Lent Bumps results
2022 in English sport